Coverage of Railway; Egremont - Beckermet - Sellafield.

In 1864 it was proposed to extend the Whitehaven, Cleator and Egremont Railway's line that ran from Moor Row to Egremont and by doing so extend it to Sellafield with a section of new railway.  The Parlementary Act for this new railway was obtained in June 1864 and it was to be known as the Cleator and Furness Railway.  When proposed the line would connect with the Whitehaven & Furness Junction Railway but soon afterwards, the W&FJR became part of the Furness Railway.  The railway would open as the joint properties of the Furness Railway and the Whitehaven, Cleator and Egremont Railway.

It was worked by the WC&ER until the company sold out to the London & North Western Railway when the FR disputed the purchase.   In 1866 the London & North Western Railway purchased two small railways in West Cumberland and the Furness Railway insisted the former company expanded no further in the Whitehaven area. An agreement was reached and it was this agreement that the Furness Railway maintained had been ignored when in 1878 the London & North Western Railway purchased the WC&ER lines.  The following year an agreement was reached where the WC&ER would become the joint property of the Furness Railway and the London & North Western Railway after which the Cleator and Furness Railway became part of the LNWR & FR Joint Lines.

See also
 Furness Railway
 London & North Western Railway
 Whitehaven, Cleator and Egremont Railway.

Sources

Railway companies disestablished in 1878
British companies disestablished in 1878
British companies established in 1864
Railway companies established in 1864